"I'm Not Gonna Let It Bother Me Tonight" is a 1978 song by the Atlanta Rhythm Section.  It was the second single release from their Champagne Jam LP, closely following their Top 10 success with "Imaginary Lover".

The song became a hit in the U.S. and Canada, reaching #14 and #15, respectively.  It did not chart outside North America.

In "I'm Not Gonna Let It Bother Me Tonight", the singer acknowledges the world in an uproar, a jungle and a rat race, filled with enough tragic problems to cause a person to resort to the most desperate measures.  However, he resolves to not face them until at least the next day, insisting that he will not allow anything to disturb him for the night. He then concludes by asking the bartender for a double.

The song was part of a U.S. chart phenomenon known as "The Frozen Fourteen" in August 1978.  After the whole top 14 of the Billboard Hot 100 did not move during the two weeks ending August 12 and 19, 1978 (this song being the one at number 14), it then dropped out of the Top 40.

Charts

Weekly charts

Year-end charts

References

External links
 Lyrics of this song
 

1977 songs
1978 singles
Atlanta Rhythm Section songs
Polydor Records singles
Songs written by Buddy Buie